The Recruiter may refer to:

The Recruiter (2004 film), a 2004 Russian language film directed by Gulshat Omarova
The Recruiter (2008 film), a 2008 documentary film directed by Edet Belzberg

See also
Recruiter